Viswanath Charali railway station is a main railway station in New Alipuduar, Assam. Its code is VNE. It serves

city. The station consists of three platforms. The station has been upgraded to a standard Class III Station.

Major trains
 New Tinsukia - Tambaram Weekly Express
 Dibrugarh - Howrah Kamrup Express Via Rangapara North
 Naharlagun–Guwahati Shatabdi Express
 Naharlagun–Guwahati Donyi Polo Express
 Kamakhya–Murkongselek Lachit Express
 Dekargaon–Murkongselek Passenger
 Rangiya–Murkongselek Passenger
 Rangiya–Murkongselek Special Passenger

References

Railway stations in Biswanath district
Rangiya railway division